The 1943 Irish general election to the 11th Dáil was held on Wednesday, 23 June, having been called on 31 May by proclamation of President Douglas Hyde on the advice of Taoiseach Éamon de Valera. It took place in 34 parliamentary constituencies for 138 seats in Dáil Éireann, the house of representatives of the Oireachtas. Fianna Fáil lost its overall majority of seats. The outgoing 10th Dáil was dissolved on 26 June, although it had not met after 26 May.

The 11th Dáil met at Leinster House on 1 July to nominate the Taoiseach for appointment by the president and to approve the appointment of a new government of Ireland on the nomination of the Taoiseach. Outgoing Taoiseach Éamon de Valera was re-appointed leading a single-party Fianna Fáil government.

Election during the emergency
Ireland had declared a state of emergency on 2 September 1939, arising from the Second World War. The Emergency Powers Act 1939 was in force at the time of the election campaign, and concomitant press censorship affected coverage.

In April the government had proposed to postpone the election by introducing a bill to extend the maximum term of the Dáil from five to six years; however, in the absence of support from the Fine Gael opposition, the bill was withdrawn.

As an alternative, the General Elections (Emergency Provisions) Act 1943 provided that a general election could be called without a dissolution and that the outgoing Dáil would not be dissolved until after all returns from the general election. This was in contravention of provisions of the Constitution, which require the president to dissolve the Dáil before a general election. However, this was permitted under the state of emergency.

Result

|}

Voting summary

Seats summary

Government formation
Fianna Fáil formed the 3rd Government of Ireland, a minority government.

First time TDs
Liam Cosgrave
Frank Daly
Michael Donnellan
Michael Hilliard
James Kilroy
Martin O'Sullivan
Leo Skinner
Dan Spring
Richard Stapleton
Patrick Finucane

Outgoing TDs
Eamonn Cooney (Lost seat)
Thomas Dowdall (Deceased)
Daniel Hogan (Lost seat)
Henry McDevitt (Retired)
Thomas Mullen (Retired)
John Munnelly (Deceased)
Frank Loughman (Lost seat)
Peter O'Loghlen (Lost seat)
Laurence Walsh (Lost seat)
Richard Walsh (Lost seat)

See also
Members of the 4th Seanad

Notes

References

Sources

1943 elections in Europe
General election, 1943
1943
11th Dáil
June 1943 events
General election